Wulf ("wolf") is an element in Germanic names.

Wulf or WULF may also refer to:
Wulf (singer), a Dutch singer, songwriter and producer
 Georg Wulf (1895-1927), German aviation pioneer and aircraft manufacturer

Wulf (Middle-earth), a character in J. R. R. Tolkien's fantasy writings
Wulf (Danny Phantom), a fictional werewolf-like character from Danny Phantom
a character in Wulf and Eadwacer, an English poem
Aegna, island in Estonia with old German name Wulf
WULF, an American radio station